Václav Ježdík (born 3 July 1987) is a Czech football player who currently plays for FO ŽP Šport Podbrezová, on loan from FC Baník Ostrava.

References

External links
 
 Profile at FK Teplice website

1987 births
Living people
Czech footballers
Czech First League players
FK Bohemians Prague (Střížkov) players
FK Teplice players
SK Dynamo České Budějovice players
FC Baník Ostrava players
FK Železiarne Podbrezová players
Expatriate footballers in Slovakia
Footballers from Prague

Association football defenders